The Lord Justice Clerk is the second most senior judge in Scotland, after the Lord President of the Court of Session.

Originally clericus justiciarie or Clerk to the Court of Justiciary, the counterpart in the criminal courts of the Lord Clerk Register, the status of the office increased over time and the Justice-Clerk came to claim a seat on the Bench by practice and custom. This was recognised by the Privy Council of Scotland in 1663 and the Lord Justice Clerk became the effective head of the reformed High Court of Justiciary in 1672 when the court was reconstituted. The Lord Justice Clerk now rarely presides at criminal trials in the High Court, with most of his or her time being spent dealing with civil and criminal appeals.

The Lord Justice Clerk has the title in both the Court of Session and the High Court of Justiciary and, as President of the Second Division of the Inner House, is in charge of the Second Division of Judges of the Inner House of the Court of Session. The office is one of the Great Officers of State of Scotland.

The current Lord Justice Clerk is Leeona Dorrian, Lady Dorrian, who was appointed to the position on 13 April 2016.

In modern times, most judges appointed as Lord Justice Clerk later become Lord President of the Court of Session.

Officeholders

 William de Camera - Justice-Clerk to David II (1324–71)
 Adam Forester
 Before 1374: Alan de Lawedre of Whitslaid & Haltoun, etc.
 1426: James de Lawedre (d. after 1459)(Grandson of Alan)
 1478: William Halket of Belsico
 1489/90: Richard Lawson of Heirigs 
 1507: James Henderson of Fordel (k. Battle of Flodden 1513)
 1513: James Wishhart of Pittarrow
 1524: Nicholas Crawfurd of Oxengangs
 1537: Adam Otterburn of Reidhall
 1537: Thomas Scot of Pitgorn
 1539: Thomas Bellenden of Auchnoule
 1540: Henry Balnaves
 1547: Sir John Bellenden of Auchnole & Broughton (d.1576)
 1577: Sir Lewis Bellenden of Auchnole & Broughton (d.1591)
 1591: Sir John Cockburn of Ormiston (d.1623)
 1625: Sir George Elphinstone of Blythswood
 1634: Sir James Carmichael of that Ilk
 1637: Sir John Hamilton of Orbiston
 1651: Sir Robert Moray
 1663: Sir John Home, of Renton, Lord Renton
 1671: Sir James Lockhart of Lee (d. 4 June 1674)
 1674: Sir William Lockhart of Lee
 1675: Sir Thomas Wallace of Craigie, Lord Craigie
 1680: Richard Maitland, 4th Earl of Lauderdale
 1684: Sir James Foulis of Colinton, Lord Colinton
 1688: Sir John Dalrymple, 1st Earl of Stair
 1690: Sir George Campbell of Cessnock
 1692: Sir Adam Cockburn of Ormiston, Lord Ormiston
 1699: Sir John Maxwell of Pollok, Lord Pollok
 1702: Roderick Mackenzie of Prestonhall, Lord Prestonhall
 1704: Sir William Hamilton of Whitelaw, Lord Whitelaw
 1705: Sir Adam Cockburn of Ormiston, Lord Ormiston
 1710: Sir James Erskine, Lord Grange
 1735: Andrew Fletcher, Lord Milton
 1748: Charles Erskine, Lord Tinwald
 1763: Gilbert Elliot, Lord Minto
 1766: Thomas Miller, Lord Barskimming
 1787: Robert Macqueen, Lord Braxfield
 1799: David Rae, Lord Eskgrove
 1804: Charles Hope, Lord Granton
 1811: David Boyle, Lord Boyle
 1841: John Hope, Lord Hope
 1858: John Inglis, Lord Glencorse
 1867: George Patton, Lord Glenalmond
 1869: James Moncreiff, Lord Moncreiff
 1888: John Macdonald, Lord Kingsburgh
 1915: Charles Dickson, Lord Dickson
 1922: Robert Munro, Lord Alness
 1933: Craigie Aitchison, Lord Aitchison
 1941: Thomas Cooper, Lord Cooper
 1947: Alexander Moncrieff, Lord Moncrieff
 1947: George Thomson, Lord Thomson
 1962: William Grant, Lord Grant
 1972: John Wheatley, Baron Wheatley
 1985: Donald Ross, Lord Ross
 1997: William Cullen, Lord Cullen
 2001: Brian Gill, Lord Gill
 2012: Colin Sutherland, Lord Carloway
 2016: Leeona Dorrian, Lady Dorrian

References

For listings to 1637 (may be wanting) refer to The Staggering State of the Scots' Statesmen, by Sir John Scot of Scotstarvet, Director of Chancery, Edinburgh, 1754, p. 183.

 
Lists of judges in Scotland